Carl E. Stewart (born January 2, 1950) is a United States circuit judge of the United States Court of Appeals for the Fifth Circuit. He was appointed by Bill Clinton in 1994, and previously sat as a judge of the Louisiana Circuit Courts of Appeal from 1985 to 1994.

Background

Stewart was born to Corine, a maid and Richard Stewart, a postal worker, in Shreveport. As a teenager in the 1960's, Stewart witnessed the civil rights struggle of the era, and saw how the legal system could be used to bring about positive social change. Stewart was inspired by what he saw and decided to dedicate his life to helping people through the legal system. He graduated from Dillard University in New Orleans with a Bachelor of Arts degree magna cum laude in 1971 and earned his Juris Doctor from Loyola University New Orleans College of Law in 1974.

In 1974, Stewart entered the U.S. Army in the Judge Advocate General's Corps. As a captain, he served as a defense attorney for soldiers at Fort Sam Houston in Texas. After an honorable discharge, Stewart worked as an associate in a small private law firm. He joined a field office of the Louisiana Attorney General in 1978.

In 1979, Stewart became an Assistant U.S. Attorney, and worked on a wide variety of cases. He prosecuted a loan shark who preyed on the poor, a sheriff who paid for votes during a reelection bid, and an unscrupulous land owner who filed false flood relief claims with the federal government. Stewart received a letter of commendation from the Justice Department for his work on a civil rights case in 1982 and 1983.

Stewart left the Justice Department in 1983 to go into private practice in Shreveport, and work as an adjunct professor at Louisiana State University. In 1985, he won election to a sixyear term as a District Judge in Louisiana. At the conclusion of the term, Stewart was elected to the position on the state's Second Circuit Court of Appeal.

Federal judicial service

Stewart sat on the Louisiana Court of Appeal for the First Circuit from 1985 to 1991 and the Louisiana Court of Appeals for the Second Circuit from 1991 to 1994. Stewart was nominated by President Bill Clinton on January 27, 1994, to the United States Court of Appeals for the Fifth Circuit, to a new seat authorized by 104 Stat. 5089. He was confirmed by the United States Senate on May 6, 1994, and received commission on May 9, 1994. He served as Chief Judge from 2012 to 2019.

Personal life 

Stewart has been married for 21 years to Jo Ann Southall Stewart, a registered nurse who works with school children who have substance abuse problems. They have three children. Stewart's two brothers also are distinguished attorneys: Captain Richard G. Stewart Jr. is a Force Judge Advocate in the U.S. Navy, and Judge James E. Stewart Sr. serves on Louisiana's District Court.  Stewart is also a lay leader of the Louisiana United Methodist Conference.

Awards and honors 

Stewart has been honored with awards from the Boy Scouts of America and the Carver Branch YMCA. Stewart also was named Louisiana Outstanding Young Man of the Year by the Louisiana Chapter of the Jaycees and won the Black Leader of the Year award from the Southern University Shreveport-Bossier Afro-American Society.

Publications

Published writings by Stewart include: "Contemporary Challenges to Judicial Independence", Loyola Law Review, Loyola University School of Law, 1997; "Balancing Professionalism, Ethics Quality of Life and the Successful Practice of Law", Proceedings of the Forty-Fifth Annual Institute of Labor Law Developments, The Southwestern Legal Foundation, 1999; and "Abuse of Power & Judicial Misconduct: A Reflection on Contemporary Ethical Issues Facing Judges", The University of St. Thomas Law Journal, The University of St. Thomas School of Law, 2003.

See also 
 List of African-American federal judges
 List of African-American jurists

References

External links

White House press release
Board of Trustees, American Inns of Court

1950 births
Living people
20th-century American judges
20th-century Methodists
21st-century American judges
21st-century Methodists
Activists for African-American civil rights
African-American judges
American legal scholars
American United Methodists
Assistant United States Attorneys
Circuit court judges in the United States
Dillard University alumni
Judges of the United States Court of Appeals for the Fifth Circuit
Louisiana Democrats
Louisiana lawyers
Louisiana state court judges
Loyola University New Orleans College of Law alumni
People from Shreveport, Louisiana
United States court of appeals judges appointed by Bill Clinton
United States Army officers